The Daily Telegraph Affair was the uproar that followed the 28 October 1908 publication in British newspaper The Daily Telegraph of comments by German Emperor Wilhelm II intended to improve German–British relations. It was a major diplomatic blunder that worsened relations and badly hurt the Kaiser's reputation; after that he played a much smaller role in deciding foreign policy. The episode had a far greater impact in Germany than overseas.

Publication
The Telegraph presented what appeared to be an interview with the Emperor. It was in fact the reworked notes by British Army officer Edward Montagu-Stuart-Wortley of conversations he had with Wilhelm II in 1907. The Telegraph sent the "interview" to Wilhelm II for approval, who in turn passed it to Chancellor Bernhard von Bülow, who later stated that he was too busy to edit the document, though Bülow's critics charged that he did not wish to challenge the Emperor. Instead, Bülow passed it on to the Foreign Ministry for their review, which apparently was not done. It included wild statements and diplomatically damaging remarks, the most infamous of which was directed at the English: 

You English are mad, mad, mad as March hares. What has come over you that you are so completely given over to suspicions quite unworthy of a great nation? What more can I do than I have done? I declared with all the emphasis at my command, in my speech at Guildhall, that my heart is set upon peace, and that it is one of my dearest wishes to live on the best of terms with England. Have I ever been false to my word? Falsehood and prevarication are alien to my nature. My actions ought to speak for themselves, but you listen not to them but to those who misinterpret and distort them. That is a personal insult which I feel and resent.

Wilhelm had seen the interview as an opportunity to promote his views and ideas on Anglo-German friendship, but due to his emotional outbursts during the course of the interview, he ended up further alienating not only the British, but also the French, Russians, and Japanese.  He implied, among other things, that the Germans cared nothing for the British; that the French and Russians had attempted to incite Germany to intervene in the Second Boer War; and that the German naval buildup was targeted against the Japanese, not Britain.

Effects
The British leadership had already decided that Wilhelm was somewhat mentally disturbed, and saw this as further evidence of his unstable personality, as opposed to an indication of official German hostility.

The Daily Telegraph crisis deeply wounded Wilhelm's previously unimpaired self-confidence, and he soon suffered a severe bout of depression from which he never fully recovered. He lost much of the influence he had previously exercised in domestic and foreign policy.

The effect in Germany was quite significant; severe embarrassment was followed by serious calls for the Emperor´s abdication. The conservative Junker politician Elard von Oldenburg-Januschau was the only member of the Reichstag to defend the Emperor throughout the affair. Wilhelm kept a very low profile for many months after the Daily Telegraph fiasco. He later exacted his revenge by forcing the resignation of the Chancellor Bülow, whom he blamed for having abandoned him to public scorn by not having the transcript edited before its German publication. Bülow recalled in his Memoirs that: 

A dark foreboding ran through many Germans that such... stupid, even puerile speech and action on the part of the Supreme Head of State could lead to only one thing – catastrophe.

Notes

Further reading
 Cecil, Lamar. Wilhelm II. Vol. II: Emperor and Exile, 1900-1941 (1996), pp 123–45. online
 Clark, Christopher M. Kaiser Wilhelm II (2000) pp. 172–80.
Kaiser Wilhelm II: New Interpretations. The Corfu Papers (Cambridge UP, 1982).
 Lerman, Katharine A. The Chancellor as Courtier: Bernhard Von Bulow and the Governance of Germany, 1900-1909 (2003).
 Massie, Robert K. Dreadnought: Britain, Germany, and the coming of the Great War (Random House, 1991) excerpt see Dreadnought (book), popular history pp 680–695.
 Orgill, Nathan N. "'Different Points of View?': The Daily Telegraph Affair as a Transnational Media Event." Historian 78.2 (2016): 213-257.
 Otte, Thomas G. "‘An altogether unfortunate affair’: Great Britain and the daily telegraph affair." Diplomacy and Statecraft 5#2 (1994): 296-333.
 Otte, Thomas G. "'The Winston of Germany': The British Foreign Policy Élite and the Last German Emperor." Canadian Journal of History 36.3 (2001): 471-504.
 Van Waarden, Betto. "Demands of a transnational public sphere: the diplomatic conflict between Joseph Chamberlain and Bernhard von Bülow and how the mass press shaped expectations for mediatized politics around the turn of the twentieth century." European Review of History: Revue européenne d'histoire 26.3 (2019): 476-504. online

Wilhelm II, German Emperor
Germany–United Kingdom relations
Germany–Japan relations
Germany–Russia relations
France–Germany relations
1908 in the United Kingdom
1908 in Germany
1908 controversies